The Annals of Duiske is an Irish annal, created from 1513.

Outline

Domhnall Riabhach Mac Murchadha Caomhánach, a son of Gerald mac Murchadha Caomhánach, became Kings of Leinster during 1478. In 1475, he had "granted eight pence annually from every plough in his territory to the abbey of Duiske." One of Domhnall's sons, Cathal Mac Murchadha Caomhánach (anglicised Charles Kavanagh), became its abbot in 1501 and in 1513 he directed one of his monks to compile the annals of Ireland. This book was known as the "Annals of Duiske" or "The Ancient Book of Graig" but it was lost. However, surviving fragments were published by Kenneth Nicholls in Peritia in 1983.

See also
 Irish annals

References

External links
https://www.brepolsonline.net/doi/abs/10.1484/J.Peri.3.33
http://sources.nli.ie/Record/MS_UR_028543
https://archive.org/stream/chartersofabbeyo00butl/chartersofabbeyo00butl_djvu.txt
http://mural.maynoothuniversity.ie/5236/1/Bridget_M_Lynch_Vol-1_20140718091407.pdf
https://www.jstor.org/stable/25507910?seq=1#page_scan_tab_contents

Irish chronicles
16th-century history books
Texts of medieval Ireland
Medieval Ireland
History of County Kilkenny
History of County Wexford